Traición is a Spanish drama television series produced by RTVE in collaboration with Bambú Producciones. It aired on La 1 from 2017 to 2018.

Premise 
Julio Fuentes (Helio Pedregal), the patriarch of the Fuentes family, has the clan gathered to announce that he is terminally ill. He also informs the members of his family that he has an illegitimate child and that he has ordered the cancellation of plans to merge his law firm with an English firm. Then the family relations begin to fall apart.

Cast 
 Ana Belén as Pilar del Riego.
 Nathalie Poza as Almudena Fuentes.
 Pedro Alonso as Roberto Fuentes.
 Manuela Velasco as Isabel Fuentes.
  as Claudia Fuentes.
 Antonio Velázquez as Carlos Santos.
 Eloy Azorín as Rafael Sotomayor.
 Begoña Maestre as Beatriz Sánchez.
  as Miriam Márquez.
 Carlos Bardem as Julián Casas.
 Gaby del Castillo as Sergio Muñoz.
 Israel Elejalde as Víctor Ayala.
 Belén López as Manuela Pastor.
  as Jaime Maldonado.
  as David Padilla.
With the special collaboration of
  as Julio Fuentes.

Production and release 
Produced by RTVE in collaboration with Bambú Producciones, Traición is based on the original idea by Ramón Campos and Gema R. Neira, who co-authored the screenplay together with Daniel Martín Serrano, Curro Novallas, José Antonio Valverde and Fran Navarro. Antonio Hernández and Lino Escalera directed the episodes. The series was known as Código de familia during the pre-production phase. Filming started in August 2017. The first episode premiered on 28 November 2017. The broadcasting run ended on 30 January 2018.

References 

2017 Spanish television series debuts
2018 Spanish television series endings
2010s Spanish drama television series
La 1 (Spanish TV channel) network series
Spanish-language television shows
Television series by Bambú Producciones